Dr. Vasantrao Pawar Medical College Hospital and Research Center is a full-fledged medical college in Nashik, Maharashtra. The college imparts the degree Bachelor of Medicine and Bachelor of Surgery (MBBS). It is recognised by the Medical Council of India. 

Selection to the college is done on the basis of merit through the National Eligibility and Entrance Test. Yearly undergraduate student intake is 120.

References

External links 
https://drvasantraopawarmedicalcollege.com/

Medical colleges in Maharashtra
Universities and colleges in Maharashtra
Educational institutions established in 1990
1990 establishments in Maharashtra
Affiliates of Maharashtra University of Health Sciences